"Going to a Go-Go" is a 1965 single recorded by The Miracles for Motown's Tamla label.

The Miracles' original version
Smokey Robinson sings lead on "Going to a Go-Go", which he co-wrote with fellow Miracles Pete Moore, Bobby Rogers, and Marv Tarplin. Moore, Rogers, Ronnie White, and Smokey Robinson's wife Claudette Robinson provide backing vocals for the song, an up-tempo dance song inviting people of all walk of life to attend a go-go party. Miracles Robinson and Pete Moore were the song's producers. In the Motown DVD release Smokey Robinson And The Miracles: The Definitive Performances, Miracles member and co-writer Bobby Rogers commented that this song was inspired by the success of the "Go-go" clubs that grew in popularity throughout the United States in the 1960s. While at first a regional phenomenon, the success of this Miracles song ignited a nationwide fad for go-go music in America.

Issued in December 1965, "Going to a Go-Go" peaked at number 11 on the Billboard Hot 100 in the United States the following spring. In addition, the single peaked at number-two on the Billboard Hot R&B Singles chart and was The Miracles' fifth million-selling record.

Cash Box described it as a "hard-driving, bluesy handclapper with an infectious repeating rhythmic riff" and felt the song was "ultra-commercial."

"Going to a Go-Go" is featured on the Miracles' album of the same name, which proved to be their highest-charting LP of all-original material. The album reached the Top Ten of the Billboard Top 200 Albums chart in early 1966, peaking at number eight, and reached #1 on the Billboard top R&B albums chart. In 2003, the Miracles' Going To A Go-Go album was ranked number 271 on Rolling Stone magazine's list of the 500 greatest albums of all time.

One of the tracks from the Going to a Go-Go LP, "Choosey Beggar", was issued as the single's b-side, and was also a hit, peaking at number 35 on the Billboard R&B chart.

The opening drum intro was sped up and copied by Showaddywaddy on the group's self penned debut single "Hey Rock 'N' Roll" in 1974.

Personnel
The Miracles
Smokey Robinson – lead vocals, producer
Marv Tarplin – 12-string lead guitar
Bobby Rogers – background vocals, co-writer
Ronnie White – background vocals
Pete Moore – background vocals, co-writer, vocal arranger
Claudette Rogers Robinson – background vocals

Other instrumentation by The Funk Brothers
Eddie Willis – rhythm guitar
Earl Van Dyke – piano
James Jamerson – bass 
Benny Benjamin – drums
Eddie "Bongo" Brown – percussion
Jack Ashford – tambourine

The Rolling Stones live version

"Going to a Go-Go" was covered by The Rolling Stones on their 1982 live album Still Life. Released as the album's first single, the Stones' version "Going to a Go-Go" reached number 26 in the British charts and number 25 in the United States. Both the single and the album were released in the middle of the European tour of the band in 1982. Other versions of the song are included on the band's Live at Leeds and Hampton Coliseum live albums.

Personnel
Mick Jagger – lead vocals
Keith Richards – guitar, background vocals
Ronnie Wood – guitar
Bill Wyman – bass
Charlie Watts – drums
Other instrumentation
Ian Stewart – piano
Ian McLagan – keyboards, background vocals
Ernie Watts – saxophone
The Glimmer Twins – producers

Charts

Weekly charts

Year-end charts

Other covers
The song was also a UK top 50 hit in 1975 by The Sharonettes.

Phil Collins recorded a cover during the sessions of his 2010 album Going Back.

The Miracles' "Going To A Go-Go" was referenced by Arthur Conley in his 1967 hit tune, "Sweet Soul Music".

Other sources
 
 Motown/Universal DVD: Smokey Robinson & The Miracles: The Definitive Performances (1963-1987)

References

External links
 The Miracles - "Going to a Go-Go" (1965) video at YouTube
 List of cover versions of "Going to a Go-Go" at SecondHandSongs.com

The Miracles songs
The Rolling Stones songs
1965 singles
1982 singles
Tamla Records singles
Songs written by Smokey Robinson
Songs written by Bobby Rogers
Songs written by Marv Tarplin
Songs written by Warren "Pete" Moore
Song recordings produced by Jagger–Richards
Song recordings produced by Smokey Robinson
Music videos directed by Russell Mulcahy
1965 songs